University of Science and Technology or University for Science and Technology can refer to any of a large number of institutions of higher education, some of which have very similar names:

Europe
AGH University of Science and Technology, Kraków, Poland
Lille University of Science and Technology, Lille, France
University for Information Science and Technology, Ohrid, Republic of Macedonia
University of Manchester Institute of Science and Technology, Manchester, United Kingdom
merged into the University of Manchester in 2004
Norwegian University of Science and Technology, Trondheim, Norway
National University of Science and Technology MISiS, Moscow, Russia

Middle East
Ajman University of Science and Technology, Ajman, United Arab Emirates
Al Ain University of Science and Technology, Al Ain, United Arab Emirates
American University of Science and Technology, Beirut, Lebanon
Arts, Sciences and Technology University in Lebanon, Beirut, Lebanon
Gulf University for Science and Technology, Kuwait
International University for Science and Technology, Oum El Qusur, Syria
Iran University of Science and Technology, Tehran, Iran
Jordan University of Science and Technology, Ar Ramtha, Jordan
King Abdullah University of Science and Technology, Thuwal, Saudi Arabia
Mazandaran University of Science and Technology, Babol, Iran
University of Science and Technology, Sana'a, Yemen
National University of Science and Technology (Oman)
 Sudan University of Science and Technology (SUST), Khartoum, Sudan
 University of Science and Technology (UST), Omdurman, Sudan
 University of Doha for Science and Technology (UDST), Doha, Qatar

South and Southeast Asia
Asian University, Chonburi, Thailand
originally known as "Asian University of Science and Technology"
Atish Dipankar University of Science and Technology, Dhaka, Bangladesh
Bangladesh Army University of Science and Technology, Bangladesh
Baddi University of Emerging Sciences and Technologies, Baddi, India
Cochin University of Science and Technology, Kochi, India
Deenbandhu Chhotu Ram University of Science and Technology, Murthal, Haryana, India
Ahsanullah University of Science and Technology, Dhaka, Bangladesh
Guru Jambheshwar University of Science and Technology, Hisar, Haryana, India
Hajee Mohammad Danesh Science and Technology University, Dinajpur, Bangladesh
Hanoi University of Science and Technology, Hanoi, Vietnam
Islamic University of Science and Technology, Awantipora, Jammu and Kashmir, India
Jessore Science and Technology University, Jessore, Bangladesh
Kohat University of Science and Technology, Kohat, Pakistan
University of Information Technology and Sciences, Dhaka, Bangladesh
Mawlana Bhashani Science and Technology University, Tangail, Bangladesh
Mirpur University of Science and Technology, Mirpur, Azad Kashmir, Pakistan
National University of Sciences and Technology, Pakistan, Islamabad, Pakistan
Nirma University of Science and Technology, Ahmedabad, India
Noakhali Science and Technology University, Noakhali, Bangladesh
Pabna University of Science and Technology, Pabna, Bangladesh
Patuakhali Science and Technology University, Patuakhali, Bangladesh
Pundra University of Science and Technology, Bogra, Bangladesh
Quaid-e-Awam University of Engineering, Science and Technology, Nawabshah, Pakistan
Sarhad University of Science and Information Technology, Peshawar, Pakistan
Shahjalal University of Science and Technology, Sylhet, Bangladesh
University of Science and Technology, Bannu, Pakistan
University of Science and Technology, Chittagong, Bangladesh

Africa
Botswana International University of Science and Technology, Gaborone, Botswana
Egypt-Japan University of Science and Technology, Alexandria, Egypt
Bayan College for Science & Technology, Khartoum, Sudan
Enugu State University of Science and Technology, Enugu, Nigeria
Kiriri Women's University of Science and Technology, Nairobi, Kenya
Kwame Nkrumah University of Science and Technology, Kumasi, Ghana
University of Medical Sciences and Technology, Khartoum, Sudan
University of Military Science and Technology, Lugazi, Uganda
Masinde Muliro University of Science and Technology, Kenya
Mbarara University of Science and Technology, Mbarara, Uganda
Misr University for Science and Technology, 6 October City, Egypt
National University of Science and Technology, Zimbabwe, Bulawayo, Zimbabwe
Walter Sisulu University for Technology and Science, Mthatha, Eastern Cape, South Africa
Regent University College of Science and Technology, Accra, Ghana
Rivers State University of Science and Technology, Port Harcourt, Nigeria
Sudan University of Science and Technology, Khartoum, Sudan
University of Science and Technology, Houari Boumediene, Algeria
University of Science and Technology (Sudan), Omdurman, Sudan

China
Anhui University of Technology and Science, Wuhu City, Anhui, China 
Changchun University of Science and Technology, Changchun, Jilin, China
Changsha University of Science and Technology, Changsha, Hunan, China
Chongqing University of Science and Technology, Chongqing, China
East China University of Science and Technology, Shanghai, China
Harbin University of Science and Technology, Harbin, Heilongjiang, China
Hebei Normal University of Science and Technology, Qinhuangdao, Hebei, China
Hebei University of Science and Technology, Shijiazhuang, Hebei, China
Henan University of Science and Technology, Luoyang, Henan, China
Hong Kong University of Science and Technology, Clear Water Bay, Sai Kung, Hong Kong
Huazhong University of Science and Technology, Wuhan, Hubei, China
Hunan University of Science and Technology, Xiangtan, Hunan, China
Inner Mongolia University of Science and Technology, Baotou, Inner Mongolia, China
Jiangxi Science and Technology Normal University, Nanchang, Jiangxi, China
Jiangxi University of Science and Technology, Ganzhou City, Jiangxi, China
Kunming University of Science and Technology, Kunming, Yunnan, China
Macau University of Science and Technology, Macau, China
Mongolian University of Science and Technology, Ulan Bator, Mongolia
Nanjing University of Science and Technology, Nanjing, Jiangsu, China
North China University of Science and Technology, Taiyuan, Shanxi, China
Qingdao University of Science and Technology, Qingdao, Shandong, China
Shaanxi University of Science and Technology, Xianyang, Shaanxi, China
Shandong University of Science and Technology, Jinan, Shandong, China
Southwest University of Science and Technology, Mianyang, Sichuan, China
Suzhou University of Science and Technology, Suzhou, Jiangsu, China
Taiyuan University of Science and Technology, Taiyuan, Shanxi, China
Tianjin University of Science and Technology, Tianjin, China
University of Electronic Science and Technology of China, Chengdu, Sichuan, China
University of Science and Technology, Beijing, China
University of Science and Technology of China, Hefei, Anhui, China
University of Science and Technology, Liaoning, Anshan, Liaoning, China
University of Shanghai for Science and Technology, Shanghai, China
not to be confused with the defunct similarly named institution below
Shanghai University of Science and Technology, Shanghai, China
merged into Shanghai University in 1994
Wuhan University of Science and Technology, Wuhan, Hubei, China
Yanbian University of Science and Technology, Yanji, Jilin, China
Zhejiang University of Science and Technology, Hangzhou, Zhejiang, China

Korea
Korea Advanced Institute of Science and Technology, Daejeon, South Korea
Korea University of Science and Technology
Pohang University of Science and Technology, Pohang, South Korea
Seoul National University of Science and Technology, Seoul, South Korea
University of Science and Technology, Daejeon, South Korea

Taiwan
National Kaohsiung University of Science and Technology, Kaohsiung, Taiwan
National Pingtung University of Science and Technology, Pingtung, Taiwan
National Taiwan University of Science and Technology, Taipei, Taiwan
National Taipei University of Technology, Taipei, Taiwan
National Taichung University of Science and Technology, Taichung, Taiwan
National Chin-Yi University of Technology, Taichung, Taiwan
National Penghu University of Science and Technology, Penghu, Taiwan
National Yunlin University of Science and Technology, Yunlin, Taiwan
Chihlee University of Technology, New Taipei, Taiwan
Lunghwa University of Science and Technology, Taoyuan, Taiwan
Minghsin University of Science and Technology, Hsinchu, Taiwan
Chung Chou University of Science and Technology, Changhua, Taiwan

Philippines
Mindanao University of Science and Technology, Cagayan de Oro, Philippines
Nueva Ecija University of Science and Technology, Cabanatuan, Philippines

United States
Harrisburg University of Science and Technology, Harrisburg, Pennsylvania, United States
Iowa State University, Ames, Iowa, United States
officially known as "Iowa State University of Science and Technology"
Missouri University of Science and Technology, Rolla, Missouri, United States

See also
 Institute of technology